Breno Pais Teixeira (born 1 January 2000), sometimes known as just Breno, is a Portuguese professional footballer who plays as a left-back for Paredes.

Playing career
Breno is a youth product of the academies of Paredes, Penafiel, Braga, Famalicão and Boavista. He began his senior career with the reserves of Boavista, before joining Águeda on loan for the second half of the 2020–21 season. Teixeira made his professional debut with Boavista in a 1–0 Taça da Liga win over Marítimo on 25 July 2021.

References

External links
 
 
 FPF Profile

2000 births
People from Paredes, Portugal
Sportspeople from Porto District
Living people
Portuguese footballers
Association football fullbacks
Boavista F.C. players
R.D. Águeda players
U.S.C. Paredes players
Campeonato de Portugal (league) players